Robert Paul Melvin (born October 28, 1961) is an American former professional baseball player and coach, who is the manager of the San Diego Padres of Major League Baseball (MLB). He has been named Manager of the Year three times.

Selected in the first round, second overall by the Detroit Tigers in the secondary phase of the 1981 draft, Melvin was a catcher for the Tigers, San Francisco Giants, Baltimore Orioles, Kansas City Royals, Boston Red Sox, New York Yankees, and Chicago White Sox during a 10-year playing career from 1985 through 1994. 

In his managing career Melvin has led the Seattle Mariners (2003–04), Arizona Diamondbacks (2005–09), and Oakland Athletics (2011–2021). Melvin was named the National League Manager of the Year in 2007, and the American League Manager of the Year in both 2012 (becoming the sixth manager in history to win the award in both leagues) and in 2018 (becoming the eighth manager ever to win the award at least three times). 

Entering the 2020 MLB season, Melvin was the longest-tenured manager in MLB with the same team. Through 2021, his 853 Oakland wins were second-most in team history (behind Connie Mack). He had an aggregate career record of 1,346–1,272 (.514) in 18 seasons as a Major League manager, and had led his clubs to seven postseason appearances and four division titles. One of fourteen managers with eight postseason appearances in MLB history, Melvin is the only one of the fourteen to have never won a league pennant.

Early years
Melvin was born in Palo Alto, California, to Judy and Paul Melvin, and grew up in Menlo Park, California.  He is Jewish, the son of a Jewish mother and a Catholic father. Through 2021, he was one of seven Jewish managers in MLB history. The others were Gabe Kapler, Brad Ausmus, Jeff Newman, Norm Sherry, Lefty Phillips, and Lipman Pike. Melvin's grandfather, R.B. "Bud" Levitas, was the original ballboy in the 1920s for the Acme Packers (precursor to the Green Bay Packers).

He resides in Berkeley, California, and in Greenwich Village in New York City, with his wife Kelley, whom he met in 1982 when he was 21 years of age. They have one daughter, Alexi (born December 21, 1988), who is an actress, writer, and filmmaker. Melvin and his family are actively involved with the Juvenile Diabetes Research Foundation; Alexi was diagnosed with juvenile diabetes at age 14.

High school and college
After attending Laurel and Encinal elementary schools in Menlo Park, Melvin played baseball (at catcher), basketball (at forward), and golf at Menlo-Atherton High School in Atherton, south of San Francisco, graduating in 1979. He batted .474 with 11 home runs for the baseball team, including .529 his senior year when he was named to the San Jose Mercury News''' All-Central Coast Section baseball team. He was the first student inducted into the school's Hall of Fame.

Melvin then enrolled at the University of California in Berkeley, and played catcher for the Golden Bears. As a freshman, he helped lead Cal to a 44–23–1 record and a third-place finish at the College World Series in 1980. Melvin finished his freshman season batting .269 with two doubles and 12 RBIs in 67 at bats over 29 games.

Following his freshman year at California, Melvin transferred to Cañada College in Redwood City, California. He played fall ball for the baseball team.

Playing career

Melvin was selected in the 1st round (2nd pick) by the Detroit Tigers in the secondary phase of the 1981 draft. He debuted in the major leagues on May 25, 1985, at the age of 23. He played 11 seasons, mostly as a back-up catcher, for the Tigers, San Francisco Giants, Baltimore Orioles, Kansas City Royals, Boston Red Sox, New York Yankees, and Chicago White Sox. As a Tiger, he backed up Lance Parrish, and as a Giant, he served as the backup for fellow catcher Bob Brenly, who, like him, went on to manage the Diamondbacks. During his winters in San Francisco, he interned at Bear Stearns.

In 1987, he caught stealing 42.9% of attempted base-stealers, second-best in the National League. In 1991, Melvin turned five double plays at catcher, fifth-most in the American League, despite playing in only 79 games. Melvin finished his career with a batting average of .233, and 35 home runs.

Coaching and scouting career
Melvin worked for Milwaukee as a scout in 1996, roving instructor in 1997, and assistant to General Manager Sal Bando in 1998. He began his coaching career as Manager Phil Garner's bench coach from 1999–2000, first with the Brewers in 1999 wearing #12 (during which time he also managed the Maryvale team in the Arizona Fall League), and then in 2000 with the Tigers, wearing #15. He was inducted into the AFL Hall of Fame in 2013.  Melvin then was Bob Brenly's bench coach with the Diamondbacks from 2001–02 wearing #3, when the team won two NL West titles, as well as the World Series in 2001.

Managerial career
Seattle Mariners (2003–2004)
Melvin managed the Seattle Mariners in 2003 and 2004 wearing #3, following the ten-year run of Lou Piniella. The M's won 93 games with a .574 win–loss percentage in 2003, as the 93 wins tied Melvin for the 15th-most by any rookie manager in Major League history. However, the team missed the playoffs, finishing three games behind Oakland in the division, and two behind Boston for the one wild card spot.

The following season was less successful, as the Mariners lost 99 games in 2004, and Melvin's contract was not extended. He finished with a 156–168 career record (.481) as Mariners manager. He returned to the Diamondbacks for whom he previously had been bench coach before being hired by the Mariners.

Arizona Diamondbacks (2005–2009)
Melvin was the second manager the Diamondbacks hired for 2005, after they fired Wally Backman before he managed a single game due to revelations of his past arrests and serious financial troubles. Melvin led the team on a 26-game improvement from a franchise-worst 51–111 mark in 2004, as the team finished 2005 with a record of 77–85.

Melvin led Arizona to a National League West title in 2007 with a record of 90–72, and a .556 win–loss percentage. The Diamondbacks entered the playoffs as the No. 1 seed in the National League.  They swept the Chicago Cubs in the NLDS, but then were swept themselves in the NLCS by the Colorado Rockies.

Melvin was named National League Sporting News Manager of the Year and MLB Manager of the Year for 2007. His nickname was "The Mad Scientist," because of his mental approach to the game.

On August 14, 2008, with his 304th win Melvin became the winningest manager in Arizona history, passing Bob Brenly. 
Melvin wore #3 as Manager with the Diamondbacks, the same number he wore with them when he was bench coach from 2001–2002.

Firing, scout, and job interviews
Melvin was fired as manager and replaced by A. J. Hinch, another former catcher, after the May 8, 2009, game. Melvin finished with a 337–340 regular season record as Diamondbacks manager, and a 3–4 post–season record.

Following the 2009 season, Melvin was a candidate to be the next manager of the Houston Astros. However, the position was filled by Brad Mills. He was interviewed by the Milwaukee Brewers for their managerial opening in October 2010, and was believed to be a finalist along with Bobby Valentine, Joey Cora, and Ron Roenicke. The position eventually went to Roenicke, then the Angels' bench coach. He was then interviewed by the New York Mets for their managerial opening before the 2011 season, but the position eventually was awarded to former Astros and Angels manager Terry Collins.

In 2010, Melvin was a scout for the New York Mets, and in May 2011 he worked for the Diamondbacks as a special baseball advisor to President & CEO Derrick Hall.

Oakland Athletics (2011–2021)

On June 9, 2011, Melvin was named interim manager of the Oakland Athletics following Bob Geren's dismissal. Melvin wore #6 after becoming manager. On September 21, he was given the managerial position on a permanent basis, with a three-year contract extension, and became the 30th manager in franchise history, and the 18th in Oakland history. The Athletics fashioned a 47–52 record under Melvin's watch, and a 74–88 overall finish to 2011. In 2011, he had the lowest rate of his pitchers issuing intentional walks per game of all AL managers, at 0.2%.

Melvin went on the Chris Townsend Show'' in the Bay Area after the first game of the 2012 season in Tokyo, and promised the fans that the A's would work hard every game. He managed the A's to the franchise's best-ever record in July at 19–5.  On October 1, the A's clinched their first playoff appearance since 2006, and two days later clinched the Western Division of the American League. For the regular season, the team was 94–68, a .580 win–loss percentage. In 2012, he used the fewest pinch runners per game of all AL managers, at 0.10. The A's lost the 2012 ALDS to the Detroit Tigers, three games to two. Melvin was honored as the 2012 American League Manager of the Year. He became the 14th manager in history to win the award at least twice in a career, and the sixth manager to win the award in both leagues.

During the 2013 season, Melvin's second full season at the helm, the A's continued what began the previous year, posting winning records for every month of the season and securing a second consecutive AL West Division Championship. Athletics' outfielder Josh Reddick referred to Melvin as the "King of Platoons" due to his extensive use of platoons. In the 2013 regular season, the team was 96–66 with a .593 win–loss percentage.

In 2014, Melvin's Athletics entered the All-Star Break with the best record in the majors. While the team faded down the stretch, it still managed to clinch an AL Wild Card berth on the final day of the season. In 2015 he only had his players place 11 sacrifice bunts, the lowest number in the AL.

On July 29, 2017, he became the 64th MLB manager to win 1,000 games in his career. On September 28, 2017, the A's and Melvin agreed to extend his contract through the 2019 season. In 2017, he used the most pinch hitters per game of any AL manager (0.79), and the fewest pinch runners per game (0.12).

On October 29, 2018, the A's awarded Melvin a long-term contract extension, through 2021 with a club option for 2022. On November 13, 2018, Melvin won his third Manager of the Year award, becoming just the 8th manager in MLB history win the award three times. He won the award after leading the baseball team with the lowest Opening Day payroll to a 97–65 record and its first post-season in four years.

In 2019, he used the fewest pinch runners per game of all AL managers, at 0.07. On June 1, 2021; with a 12–6 win over the Mariners, Melvin tallied his 798th win as A's manager. This vaulted him past Tony La Russa to become the second-winningest manager in A's history, and the winningest in the West Coast portion of franchise history. In 2021 he led all AL managers with an average of 0.99 pinch hitters per game. 

By the end of his A's tenure, his 853 wins were second-most in team history, behind only Hall of Fame manager Connie Mack. His 1,346 wins ranked 34th in MLB history. Among active Major League managers, only Dusty Baker, and Terry Francona has more wins. He had led his teams to seven postseason appearances and four division titles. ESPN reported: "With the A's, Melvin developed a reputation as a players' manager as well as a keen strategist, and in a division in which his team often carried the lowest payroll, he found consistent success."

San Diego Padres (2021–present)
On November 1, 2021, Melvin became the 22nd manager of the San Diego Padres. He signed a three-year contract.

In his first season as manager, Melvin led the Padres to the postseason, the Padres first playoff berth in a full season since 2006. In the Wild Card Series, against the New York Mets, the Padres defeated the Mets 2-1 to advance. Under Melvin, the Padres defeated the 111-win Los Angeles Dodgers three games to one in the 2022 National League Division Series,  but lost the league championship series to the Philadelphia Phillies 4 games to 1.

Managerial record

See also

 List of Major League Baseball managers by wins
 List of select Jewish baseball players

References

External links

1961 births
Living people
Arizona Diamondbacks coaches
Arizona Diamondbacks managers
Baltimore Orioles players
Baseball players from California
Birmingham Barons players
Boston Red Sox players
California Golden Bears baseball players
Cañada Colts baseball players
Chicago White Sox players
Columbus Clippers players
Detroit Tigers coaches
Detroit Tigers players
Evansville Triplets players
Jewish American baseball managers
Jewish American baseball players
Jewish Major League Baseball players
Kansas City Royals players
Macon Peaches players
Major League Baseball bench coaches
Major League Baseball catchers
Manager of the Year Award winners
Milwaukee Brewers coaches
Milwaukee Brewers scouts
Nashville Sounds players
New York Mets scouts
New York Yankees players
Oakland Athletics managers
People from Germantown, Tennessee
Phoenix Firebirds players
San Francisco Giants players
Seattle Mariners managers
Sportspeople from Palo Alto, California
21st-century American Jews